Oecophyllembiinae is a subfamily of moths described by Pierre Réal and Alfred Serge Balachowsky in 1966.

Diversity and distribution

Description

Biology

Genera
In alphabetical order:

Angelabella Vargas & Parra, 2005
Corythoxestis  Meyrick, 1921
Eumetriochroa  Kumata, 1998
Guttigera Diakonoff, 1955
Metriochroa Busck, 1900
Prophyllocnistis Davis, 1994

References

Moth subfamilies
Gracillariidae